Nebria lariollei is a species of beetle in the family Carabidae that is endemic to France.

Subspecies
The species have only 2 subspecies, all of which are found in Italy and Switzerland:
Nebria lariollei gaudini Jeannel, 1942
Nebria lariollei lariollei Germiny, 1865

References

External links
Nebria lariollei at Fauna Europaea

lariollei
Beetles described in 1865
Endemic beetles of Metropolitan France